"The Ecstasy of Gold" is a musical composition by Ennio Morricone, part of his score for the 1966 Sergio Leone film The Good, the Bad and the Ugly. It is played while Tuco (Eli Wallach) is frantically searching a cemetery for the grave that holds $200,000 in gold coins.  Sung by Edda Dell'Orso, it stands as one of the most well known of Morricone's themes and one of the most iconic pieces of cinematic score in history.

Appearances in other media

By other musicians
 An instrumental metal cover by Metallica appears on the 2007 Morricone tribute album We All Love Ennio Morricone. It reached #21 on Billboard's Mainstream Rock charts and was nominated for a Grammy Award in the category of Best Rock Instrumental Performance. The band also uses the original recording to open up their concerts.

 Jay-Z samples the beat in his song Blueprint 2 on his 2002 album The Blueprint²: The Gift & the Curse

 The main melody and vocals are sampled in the 2022 glitch hop song "Ecstasy of Soul" by electronic artists Zeds Dead and GRiZ. The song peaked at #19 on the US Dance/Electronic Songs chart.

Films
 Appears in the 2006 film Jackass Number Two as the Jackass crew takes part in a running of the bulls.
 Appears in the 2014 film The Book of Life as Manolo fights a bull.
 Appears in the 2015 film The SpongeBob Movie: Sponge Out of Water as Spongebob announces to volunteer in sacrificing himself to save Bikini Bottom.
 Appears in the 2017 film The Battleship Island during the climactic prison escape set piece where Korean prisoners board a boat while fighting off Japanese soldiers.
 Appears in the 2022 documentary film Fire of Love.

Television
 The episode "XCIII" in Samurai Jack's 5th season pays homage to the cemetery scene when Jack hides from the Daughters of Aku in a stone coffin within a ruined temple (complete with a reimagining of The Ecstasy of Gold).
 It was played on the final episode of Brazilian novela Império, during a montage where the characters played by Leandra Leal, Lilia Cabral, Andreia Horta and Marina Ruy Barbosa head to Mount Roraima to scatter the ashes of José Alfredo de Medeiros (played by Alexandre Nero).
The episode "UFOs" of Louis Theroux's Weird Weekends played while Louis is driving to Area 51.

Commercials
 A television spot for L.L.Bean, entitled "The Pitch," used the song while showing a family softball game in a driving rain storm.
 A commercial for KFC in the UK showing a standoff between a chicken and a turkey used the song.
 Modelo uses the song in their "Fighting Spirit" commercials.

Video games 
 Appears in the NBA 2K14 Next-Gen Intro video.
 Contained in the overworld theme "Lone Bird in the Shire" in Wild Arms (video game).

YouTube 
 The Danish National Symphony Orchestra included The Ecstasy of Gold in the second half of their YouTube video "The Good, The Bad, and the Ugly". The featured soloist was soprano Christine Nonbo Andersen. Since the video's release on YouTube on January 26 2018, the video has garnered over 104,003,519 views as of 30 August 2022. 
Carolina Eyck has covered The Ecstasy of Gold both singing and playing the theremin. Since the video's release on YouTube on April 8 2017, the video has garnered over 8.7 million views as of April 2022.

Radio 
 Used on the XM Radio show Opie and Anthony as its opening song preparing its listeners for the ensuing battle they had daily.

Marching Arts
 Used as a part of The Troopers Drum and Bugle Corps 2022 production entitled VorAcious.

References

1966 compositions
1966 songs
Compositions in A minor
Dollars Trilogy
Ennio Morricone songs
Film theme songs
Metallica songs
Songs written for films